Laton Hill is an unincorporated community in Washington County, Alabama, United States, located on Alabama State Route 56,  west of Chatom.

References

Unincorporated communities in Washington County, Alabama
Unincorporated communities in Alabama